The city of Kamakura, in what is now Japan's Kanagawa Prefecture, was besieged twice:
Siege of Kamakura (1333)
Siege of Kamakura (1526)